Roman Jacek Giertych (born 27 February 1971 in Śrem, Poland) is a Polish politician and lawyer; he was deputy prime minister and minister of education until August 2007. He was a member of the Sejm (the lower house of the Polish parliament) from 2001 until October 2007 and the chairman of the League of Polish Families party.

Early life 
Roman Giertych comes from a family of Polish politicians, a son of Maciej Giertych and a grandson of Jędrzej Giertych. His uncle on his father's side is Wojciech Giertych, O.P., Theologian of the Pontifical Household and professor of theology at the Pontifical University of Saint Thomas Aquinas, Angelicum in Rome. Two of his aunts also entered religious life.

Political career
Giertych and the LPR had a strong national and anti-EU profile. Prior to the 2003 Polish referendum on EU membership, the LPR campaigned against it, denouncing it as a "centralised, socialist superstate". Officially, the LPR declares that it favours a "Europe of nations". Under Giertych's leadership, the LPR was successful in the European Parliament elections in June 2004, temporarily becoming the second-strongest Polish party with 14% of the votes. His father Maciej Giertych was elected MEP. In the 2005 parliamentary elections, LPR gained 8% of the votes.

In July 2004, Roman Giertych was elected a member and vice-chairman of PKN Orlen investigation commission, which is credited, among other things, with destroying the presidential aspirations of Włodzimierz Cimoszewicz.

Minister of Education
On 5 May 2006, Giertych was appointed minister of education and vice-premier, while the LPR joined a governmental coalition with PiS. His nationalist views made the decision controversial by some. The following day, about 100 people protested in front of the Ministry of Education against this appointment. A couple of weeks, later almost 140 000 people signed a petition to remove him from the post.

In March 2007 Roman Giertych proposed a bill that would ban homosexual people from the teaching profession and would also allow dismiss from employment those teachers who promote "the culture of homosexual lifestyle".

Legal career
After leaving the parliament, Roman Giertych returned to legal practice. He represented Ryszard Krauze, accused of dealing with a gang, in a trial in which the claim was allowed in the first instance, consequently ordering Telewizja Polska (Polish Television) and Anita Gargas to apologize to the entrepreneur. He was also the attorney of Radosław Sikorski regarding offensive comments made on the internet forum of the weekly Wprost website.

Giertych was involved in helping the Jewish community of Góra Kalwaria to reclaim and a process of restoration of a local synagogue. The project span a period of 2 years, culminating in 2016. Roman Giertych has been appointed as the lawyer of the head of the European Council, Donald Tusk, in an inquiry into the cooperation of Polish services with the Russian FSB. He also represented the Tusk family. He was Michał Tusk's attorney in the won case against Fakt daily, as well as in the case concerning a stone thrown through a window of Michał Tusk’s apartment. In addition, Giertych was also Katarzyna Tusk's attorney in a trial, resulting in an apology on the Fakt website, ordered by the Court of Appeal in Warsaw. He represented Donald Tusk in cases before prosecutors, the Amber Gold Investigation Committee and the VAT Investigation Committee.

Giertych also represented Gerald Birgfellner in a case against the company Srebrna and his dispute with Jarosław Kaczyński; as well as acted on behalf of Leszek Czarnecki in the case of the so-called KNF scandal  and in the case of the so-called GetBack scandal.

In 2009, Roman Giertych won a lawsuit brought against the publisher of the Fakt for the protection of personal rights. In 2017, he finally won a case before the Supreme Court related to the liability of publishers for the content of comments made under articles on websites.

The deputy public prosecutor general Bogdan Święczkowski filed a motion against Giertych to the bar's disciplinary court to punish him for the criticism he had expressed towards Zbigniew Ziobro and the prosecutor's office at the end of 2016. The case was discontinued in 2017 by the Disciplinary Court of the Bar Association in Warsaw, however, the prosecutor general appealed against the decision of the bar body with a cassation appeal to the Disciplinary Chamber of the Supreme Court, operating since March 2019. The application examined in May 2019 was the first case of this type settled by the chamber. Giertych, commenting on these proceedings, assessed them as an attempt to "intimidate lawyers by the highest organs of the prosecution." He also indicated that, in his opinion, this was related to his activities as a plenipotentiary of Donald Tusk and Gerald Birgfellner. The Disciplinary Chamber, consisting of three judges examining the case, referred it to a seven-person composition for examination. In February 2020, this reversal was finally dismissed.

On October 15 Giertych was detained on accusations of money laundering. The District Court in Poznań issued a decision stating that the prosecutor's office did not present any indications that the suspect had committed a crime.

On July 20 European Commission published the rule of law situation in the European Union. European Commission indicated that according to the National Bar Council, the prosecution services have recently also been targeting defense lawyers acting in politically sensitive cases, thereby posing a threat to the right to professional secrecy. Commission as an example indicated the case of Roman Giertych of October 15, 2020

Giertych, together with Jacek Dubois and Mikołaj Pietrzak, are dealing with a notification to the International Criminal Court in The Hague of the commission of a crime by the Minister of Justice and Prosecutor General Zbigniew Ziobro and his deputy, National Prosecutor Bogdan Święczkowski, as well as "as yet undetermined co-responsible persons". On 21 October 2021, the Court was informed that the case had commenced. The initial part of the procedure - under the so-called signalling - follows. The International Criminal Court in The Hague has appointed an official to contact the notifying lawyers. He may also undertake the first screening activities.

In late December 2021, the Associated Press revealed that the phone Roman Giertych used in 2019 was 18 infected by Pegazus. The hacks of Roman Giertych's attorney's phone occurred just before the 2019 parliamentary elections. Phone hacks have also occurred outside of Poland - at least twice in Italy: in Rome and Venice. An expert from the Citizen Lab at the University of Toronto, in interviews, has indicated that he has never seen a phone attacked so intensely. The Civic Coalition has announced that it wants to set up a commission of inquiry into the use of Pegasus in Poland.

On 10 February 2022, the European People's Party organised a public hearing on the threats posed by the Pegasus spyware to democracy and the rule of law. Roman Giertych spoke at the public hearing in the European Parliament about, among other things, the abuse of Pegasus in Poland.

On March 29, 2022 the Court did not consent to the temporary arrest. Moreover, the spokeswoman of the District Court Lublin-Zachód conveyed that the Court did not grant the motion due to the general lack of grounds for the application of preventive measures in the form of a high probability that Patron Roman Giertych did not commit the acts he was accused of.

Roman Giertych has apologised for "his mistake regarding the European Union". He state that he believes the EU is protecting European democracy and should be supported. 
In March, a new report by the Helsinki Foundation for Human Rights appeared - State of the Prosecution. Prosecution in 2016-2022. In this report, the case of the detention of Roman Giertych was included. The Foundation pointed to it as a flagship example of the prosecution's actions against political opponents.

On April 29, 2022 the Regional Court in Lublin upheld the decision of a lower instance court and did not agree to the temporary arrest of Roman Giertych.

The Parliamentary Assembly of the Council of Europe, in a declaration dated June 27, 2022, urged the European Union not to compromise on the rule of law in Poland. The declaration indicated that EU rights and values should be guaranteed in Poland by, among other things, stopping the prosecution's repression of political opponents of the government, such as lawyer Roman Giertych.

On 13 July 2022, the European Commission published a report on the state of the rule of law in Poland. The report identified the case of Roman Giertych, who was being surveilled by the Pegasus software. The Commission found the use of his phone calls, which were covered by attorney-client privilege.

References

1971 births
Living people
People from Śrem
Polish Roman Catholics
League of Polish Families politicians
Christian creationists
Polish male non-fiction writers
21st-century Polish lawyers
Polish nationalists
Members of the Polish Sejm 2001–2005
Members of the Polish Sejm 2005–2007
Deputy Prime Ministers of Poland
Education ministers of Poland